Eugenio Rolando Martínez Careaga (alias Musculito, July 8, 1922 – January 30, 2021) was a member of the anti-Castro movement in the early 1960s, and later was one of the five men recruited by G. Gordon Liddy and E. Howard Hunt in 1972 for the Memorial Day weekend Watergate burglary at the Democratic National Committee (DNC) headquarters in Washington, D.C. He later worked as a real estate agent.

Weeks after the initial break-in, on June 17, 1972, the men were arrested by District of Columbia Police inside DNC headquarters during what they said was a second entry into the building to correct problems with the first break-in. Martinez and the others were convicted in the ensuing Watergate scandal. The others were Frank Sturgis, Virgilio Gonzalez, Bernard Barker and James McCord. After completing his 15 month prison term, Martinez was pardoned by President Ronald Reagan in 1983. Martínez was the only person aside from Nixon to receive a pardon for his role in the scandal.

Martinez was portrayed in All the President's Men, the 1976 film retelling the events of the Watergate scandal, by Dominic Chianese.

On August 31, 2016, the conservative watchdog group Judicial Watch obtained CIA internal documents, through a FOIA request, that stated Martinez was a paid asset of the Agency at the time of the break-in.  Although his connection to the Agency was acknowledged, until this release the CIA had maintained that his service had ended and he no longer had an association with the Agency for at least two years prior to the incident at the Watergate Hotel. He died on January 30, 2021, at his daughter's home in Minneola, Florida at the age of 98.

References

External links 
 watergate.info
 Spartacus Biography - Eugenio Martinez

Cuban emigrants to the United States
Opposition to Fidel Castro
Recipients of American presidential pardons
Watergate Seven
1922 births
2021 deaths
People from Pinar del Río
People convicted in the Watergate scandal
Exiles of the Cuban Revolution in the United States
Florida Republicans